Teresa Bright is a native-Hawaiian entertainer (vocalist and musician) who plays 'ukulele and guitar. Her music is popular in Japan as well as in Hawaii and the United States mainland. Much of her repertoire features lyrics in the Hawaiian Language, but she has an extensive jazz and hapa-haole repertoire as well.

Life
Bright attended the University of Hawaii and launched her music career in the 1980s as one half of "Steve and Teresa" alongside Steve Mai`i. Her first solo album was released in 1990.

She received a lifetime achievement award from Hawaiʻi Academy of Recording Arts on December 6 2020.

Japan
Bright is popular in Japan, and some of her albums are not released outside of the country. Besides album sales, Bright has also participated in Japanese advertising campaigns for Max Factor, Toyota, NTT Japan, Sapporo Beer, and Japan Airlines.

Okinawa
Her 2007 album, Hawaiinawa, features popular Okinawan songs with lyrics translated into the Hawaiian Language.

Awards 
2009 - Na Hoku Hanohano Award
1991 - Na Hoku Hanohano Award
1988 - Na Hoku Hanohano Award (shared with Steve Mai`i)

Discography
1981 Catching a Wave
1983 Ocean Blue
1986 Intimately
1990 Self Portrait
1994 Painted Tradition
1995 A Bright Hawaiian Christmas
1996 Kapilina and Quiet Girl
1997 Quiet Nights
1998 Crossing the Blue
2000 A Christmas Season’s Delight
2002 Lei Ana
2004 A Gallery
2006 Pretty Eyes
2007 Hawaiinawa
2008 Tropic Rhapsody

References

External links
 Teresa Bright "He No O Honolulu"
 Teresa Bright ~ Kawaikapu Hewett ka pilina "A Unique Collaboration" - Hale Pai. Pacific American-News Journal artist review

University of Hawaiʻi alumni
Musicians from Honolulu
Living people
Year of birth missing (living people)
Na Hoku Hanohano Award winners